Black Heart may refer to:

 Uranothauma nubifer, an African butterfly also known as "black heart"

Arts and entertainment

Books
 Black Heart (Eric Van Lustbader novel)
 Black Heart (Holly Black novel), a 2011 book by Holly Black

Music
 Black Heart (Kish Mauve album), a 2009 album by Kish Mauve
 Black Heart (Within the Ruins album), a 2020 album  
 Black Heart (Stooshe song), 2012
 Black Heart (Stone Temple Pilots song), 2013
 "Black Heart", a song from the deluxe edition of Emotion (Carly Rae Jepsen album)

See also
 Blackheart (disambiguation)